Wake Up is the debut album by the American Christian rock artist Paige Armstrong.  The album, produced by Chris Omartian and Brian Hitt, was released on October 6, 2009 under Whiplash Records (though Armstrong is part of the iShine family) and marks the beginning of Armstrong's professional career after her struggle with cancer.  Unlike other iShine artists, Armstrong's album Wake Up boasts a hard rock sound, with guitar solos, profound bass, and occasional vocals, as opposed to the normal pop sound performed by other iShine artists.

Track listing

Music videos
 "Wake Up" feat. Our Heart's Hero

References

2009 debut albums
Paige Omartian albums